Walter Bradsher Barbee Jr. (April 30, 1916 – August 22, 1986), nicknamed "Lamb", was an American Negro league outfielder in the 1940s.

A native of Durham, North Carolina, Barbee was the brother of fellow Negro leaguer Bud Barbee. The brothers played together for the Cincinnati Clowns in 1945, Lamb's only professional season on record. Barbee died in Durham in 1986 at age 70.

References

External links
 and Seamheads

1916 births
1986 deaths
Cincinnati Clowns players
Baseball outfielders
Baseball players from North Carolina
Sportspeople from Durham, North Carolina
20th-century African-American sportspeople